Chitek Lake 191 is an Indian reserve of the Pelican Lake First Nation in Saskatchewan. In the 2016 Canadian Census, it recorded a population of 821 living in 164 of its 300 total private dwellings. In the same year, its Community Well-Being index was calculated at 46 of 100, compared to 58.4 for the average First Nations community and 77.5 for the average non-Indigenous community.

References

Pelican Lake First Nation
Indian reserves in Saskatchewan
Division No. 16, Saskatchewan